Robin Miller may refer to:

Robin Miller (nurse) (1940–1975), also known as the "Sugarbird Lady", Australian aviator and nurse
Robin Miller (journalist) (1949–2021), American motorsports journalist
Robin Miller (technology journalist) (1952–2018), also known as "Roblimo",  American journalist specializing in technology
Robin Miller (chef) (born 1966), American television personality and food writer
Robin Miller (businessman), British businessman

See also
Robyn Miller (born 1966), co-founder of Cyan Worlds, the creators of the Myst computer game
Robin Millar (born 1951), English musician